Samuel Hübinette, a.k.a. The Crazy Swede (born 15 September 1971, in Jokkmokk, Norrbotten County), is a Swedish professional race car driver and Hollywood stunt driver.  He started working as a test driver for Volvo Cars. Today he is one of the top names in drifting, having won the inaugural Formula D series championship in 2004 and 2006.

Complete drifting results

D1 Grand Prix

Formula D

Racing record

Complete Global RallyCross Championship results

Supercar

References

External links 

Formula D profile

1971 births
Living people
People from Jokkmokk Municipality
Swedish racing drivers
Drifting drivers
D1 Grand Prix drivers
Formula D drivers
Global RallyCross Championship drivers
Sportspeople from Norrbotten County